Tammy Murphy (née Snyder; born August 5, 1965) is an American financier who has been the First Lady of New Jersey since 2018. She is also the chair of professional women's soccer team NJ/NY Gotham FC, which she co-owns with her husband, the 56th Governor of New Jersey, Phil Murphy. Prior to her political and sports executive roles, Murphy was a banker for Goldman Sachs.

Early life and education 
Tammy Murphy was born Tammy Snyder in Virginia Beach, Virginia. Her parents, Edward and Jean, owned car dealerships. Edward was Jewish. She attended the University of Virginia, graduating in 1987 with a Bachelor of Arts in Communications and English.

Career 
After graduating, Murphy went to work in finance for Goldman Sachs. Murphy's time working for Goldman Sachs included a stint in London. Since 2014 she has been chair of New Start New Jersey, a group she founded with her husband, Phil Murphy. She was appointed to the University of Virginia Board of Visitors in 2015.

Political activity 
Murphy grew up a Republican. She made donations to Republican candidates, including George W. Bush and the New Jersey Republican Party. She changed political party in the mid-2000s based on her stances on issues such as abortion, gun control, and the environment. Her husband, Phil Murphy, became the Democratic National Committee's finance chair in 2006. Al Gore recruited her to be a founding member of the environmental group The Climate Reality Project.

Murphy was active in her husband's 2017 campaign for Governor of New Jersey. Phil called her his "de-facto finance chair." She also participated in campaign events with and without her husband. Phil Murphy was elected Governor on November 7, 2017, and sworn in to office on January 16, 2018.

She voted for Joe Biden in the 2020 presidential election.

First Lady of New Jersey 
Although she does not receive a salary or hold an official title, Murphy has taken on a policy portfolio as First Lady. Murphy has been more visible in the role than her predecessors and is the first spouse of a New Jersey Governor to give her own speech at the inauguration. Tammy Murphy was given an office down the hall from that of her husband.

In 2021, Murphy was appointed Honorary Chair of the New Jersey Council on the Green Economy.

Personal life 

Tammy Snyder met Phil Murphy in 1987 when they were both employees of Goldman Sachs. Their paths crossed a few times, but they did not work closely together. Tammy reached out to Phil in 1993 after the death of his brother and the two had dinner. They were engaged 18 days later and married six months after that.

The Murphys have four children, Josh, Emma, Charlie, and Sam. The family members are all fans of soccer, including playing family soccer matches. In 2000, the family moved to Middletown Township, New Jersey. They moved to Germany for four years while Phil was serving as ambassador. The Murphys are friends of Jon Bon Jovi and his family, their neighbors in Middletown.

References

External links 
 First Lady Tammy Snyder Murphy

1965 births
Living people
First Ladies and Gentlemen of New Jersey
New Jersey Democrats
Goldman Sachs people
NJ/NY Gotham FC owners
People from Middletown Township, New Jersey
People from Virginia Beach, Virginia
University of Virginia alumni
American women bankers
American bankers
American investment bankers
American people of Jewish descent
2020 United States presidential electors
21st-century American women